Valeriy Semenovych Porkuyan (born 4 October 1944 in Kirovohrad, Ukrainian SSR, now Ukraine) is a former Ukrainian footballer of Armenian descent who played for Dynamo Kyiv.

Playing career

Club 
Porkuyan began playing for the youth team of Kirovohrad's local club, Zvezda. In 1962 he made the transition to the senior team of Zvezda. After three successful seasons there he was spotted by a former Chernomorets Odessa player and then assistant coach, Matvey Cherkassky, who helped him transfer from the Soviet Second League B to the Soviet Top League club Chernomorets. That season he played alongside Valeri Lobanovsky, who was finishing up his playing career in Odessa. His form there attracted the attention of many top clubs, including Spartak Moscow and Dnipro, but he was eventually moved to Dynamo Kyiv. At 21 years of age he made the first team in his first season with the team. On the strength of that first season, when he scored 7 goals, he was chosen by the head-coach of USSR national football team, Nikolai Morozov to travel to the 1966 FIFA World Cup. Porkuyan won three Soviet Top League championships with Dynamo Kyiv (in 1966, 1967 and 1968), as well as the Soviet Cup in 1966. But despite those triumphs he failed to secure a spot in a very competitive team at the time. In 1970, he made a return to Odessa to once again play with Chornomorets. He had two solid seasons there, despite the club being relegated to the Soviet First League. In 1972, he was invited to move to Dnipro, who were coached by his former teammate Valeri Lobanovsky. He made the majority of his playing appearances with Dnipro in the 4 years he spent there. He retired from playing in 1976.

International 
He earned 8 caps and scored 4 goals for the USSR national football team. Incredibly he scored his four goals in his first three international matches during the 1966 FIFA World Cup. He also was selected to play in the 1970 FIFA World Cup, but did not play any matches. He is the only active player of FC Chornomorets Odessa to have featured in a World Cup team.

Coaching career 
After retiring from playing he moved into coaching the following year in 1976, becoming assistant coach with SC Tavriya Simferopol. Along the way he had stints coaching amateur teams playing in the lower divisions. But since the 1980s he, almost continuously, has been connected with Chornomorets Odessa in a coaching capacity.

Honours

Club
Dynamo Kyiv
 Soviet Top League Champion: 1966, 1967, 1968
 Soviet Cup Champion: 1966

Individual
 Merited Master of Sports: 1966
FIFA World Cup Bronze Boot: 1966

External links 
 Russian National Team history page  
 Statistics at Odessa Football 

1944 births
Living people
Sportspeople from Kropyvnytskyi
Soviet footballers
Ukrainian people of Armenian descent
Ukrainian footballers
1966 FIFA World Cup players
1970 FIFA World Cup players
FC Chornomorets Odesa players
FC Dynamo Kyiv players
FC Zirka Kropyvnytskyi players
FC Dnipro players
Soviet Top League players
Soviet Union international footballers
FC Chornomorets-2 Odesa managers
FC Okean Kerch managers
Soviet football managers
Ukrainian football managers
Association football forwards
Ethnic Armenian sportspeople
Soviet Armenians